Meteor of Light is a 2013 Iranian film thriller directed by Mohammedreza Eslamloo. The film premiered at the 32nd Fajr International Film Festival in February 2014.

Synopsis
Eslamloo sets his film among the events of the 2006 Lebanon War, incorporating elements of Chapter 12 of the Book of Revelation. It is the first Iranian film to present Jihadi terrorism as a criminal activity.

Cast
 Amin Zendegani
 Bassem Mughniyeh
 Abu Sharif

2013 films
Iranian thriller films